Jay Michael DeMerit (born December 4, 1979) is an American retired soccer player who played as a center back.

He played college soccer for the UIC Flames and was in the Chicago Fire Premier development squad, but after not being drafted for Major League Soccer, he moved to look for a club in England. He played for non-league sides Southall and Northwood before signing for Watford of the Championship in 2004. DeMerit played 211 total games for Watford over six seasons, including one in the 2006–07 Premier League, having scored in their victory in the 2006 Football League Championship play-off Final. After his release from Watford, he was the first player signed by the Vancouver Whitecaps FC for their entrance in MLS, where he played four seasons before retiring through injury.

DeMerit was first capped for the United States in March 2007, earning 25 caps up to 2011. He was part of their squads that won the 2007 CONCACAF Gold Cup and came runners-up at the 2009 FIFA Confederations Cup, also featuring at the 2007 Copa América and the 2010 FIFA World Cup.

Club career

Early career
DeMerit was a three-sport high school athlete in Wisconsin, where he participated in basketball and track in addition to soccer. He attended Bay Port High School and graduated in 1998.

DeMerit played college soccer at the University of Illinois at Chicago, where he moved from playing forward to defender. While in college, DeMerit formed part of a defensive backline that helped lead the team into the NCAA playoffs in 2000. Although he played with Chicago Fire Premier, the development team of the Chicago Fire in the USL Premier Development League, he was not drafted or signed by any Major League Soccer clubs following graduation from college. After spending some time working as a bartender, DeMerit took the advice of a former European teammate and decided to take advantage of his European Union work status (due to his Danish grandfather) by moving to England in 2003 with $1,800, in an attempt to find a club to play for. He started off playing in the ninth tier of English soccer for Southall, earning only £40 a week.

In July 2004, DeMerit joined Northwood, a seventh-tier side, to play in some of their pre-season matches. Northwood played Watford, then a Football League Championship team, in their second pre-season match. During the course of the match, DeMerit impressed then Watford manager Ray Lewington enough to earn a two-week trial. Following the trial, DeMerit signed a one-year contract with Watford to play in their 2004–05 season.

Watford
In November, he signed an extension to his contract, keeping him with the club until 2007. He scored his first goal for the club on 15 January 2005, scoring Watford's third in a 3–1 win against Crewe Alexandra by "slamming into the bottom corner from 20 yards".

During the 2005–06 season, Watford was expected to fight relegation from the Championship to League One as they had in DeMerit's first season with the club. However, under new coach Aidy Boothroyd, Watford maintained strong form throughout the season and finished third in the Championship table, earning the right to enter the playoffs for the last of three annual promotion spots to the Premier League. On May 21, 2006, in the play-off final against Leeds United, DeMerit headed in the game's first goal and was named Man of the Match as Watford gained promotion to the Premier League by defeating Leeds United 3–0. Soon afterwards, he joined the ranks of athlete-musicians by releasing a single entitled "Soccer Rocks", available in the club shop.

DeMerit's hard work in the 2005–06 Championship season and his efforts in helping get the club promoted was rewarded with a contract extension taking him through the end of the 2008–09 season as a Watford player. He was named as one of three candidates for Watford's 2006–07 Player of the Season award, which was ultimately won by goalkeeper Ben Foster.

Until the 2007–08 season, DeMerit often filled the role of Watford's vice-captain, behind then-captain Gavin Mahon. He captained Watford for the first time on December 9, 2006, in the home game against Reading, and re-donned the armband on January 6, 2007, for the 4–1 win over Stockport County in the FA Cup third round. On December 15, 2007, it was announced that DeMerit had been named captain, replacing Mahon, whose contract was not being renewed. However, this later proved to be a temporary move, with the captaincy rotating between himself, Danny Shittu, and Richard Lee, before finally being passed to John Eustace, a newly signed central midfielder. In later interviews, DeMerit admitted that this placed strain on his relationship with manager Adrian Boothroyd.

Early in the 2009–10 season, DeMerit suffered a scratch on his eyeball while removing a contact lens. DeMerit's eye became infected, severely obscuring his vision and requiring a corneal transplant in October. He returned to action on December 7, 2009, playing the second half of Watford's 3–1 victory over Queens Park Rangers. DeMerit's contract at Watford expired in June 2010, and was not renewed.

Vancouver Whitecaps FC 

On November 18, 2010, DeMerit was announced as the first player signed by Vancouver Whitecaps FC in preparation for their entry into Major League Soccer in 2011. He was also named the captain right before the season started. During the 2011 Major League Soccer season, DeMerit was out for a considerable amount of the season and the Whitecaps ended up finishing last in the league. In 2012, DeMerit was healthy the whole year and led the team to a decent finish. DeMerit was even named an MLS All-Star and played against Chelsea in the 2012 MLS All-Star Game. The MLS All-Stars won 3–2 against Chelsea.

In July 2014, DeMerit announced his retirement after a series of injuries.

International career
DeMerit earned his first cap for the United States national team on March 28, 2007, starting in a friendly against Guatemala. He was a member of the U.S. Men's National Team that won the 2007 CONCACAF Gold Cup, thus qualifying for the 2009 FIFA Confederations Cup.

In the 2009 Confederations Cup, DeMerit started at center back due to Carlos Bocanegra's hamstring injury. He played the entire game when the U.S. Men's National Team defeated Spain in the semi-final 2–0 on June 24, 2009. The Barcelona sports daily El Mundo Deportivo called DeMerit's play "superb". DeMerit also played the entire match when the USMNT lost 3–2 to Brazil in the Cup final on June 28, 2009.

For the 2010 FIFA World Cup in South Africa, he made Bob Bradley's 23-man squad, and started all four of the United States matches – the three first-round games, against England, Slovenia, and Algeria, and the second round match against Ghana, in which the U.S. Men's National Team were eliminated. During the Algeria match he played most of the game with a split tongue that required five stitches after the game.

Despite his success in the World Cup squad and with Vancouver, he was not recalled to the national team under Bradley's successor Jürgen Klinsmann.

Personal life
His career is the subject of the 2011 independent film, Rise and Shine: The Jay DeMerit Story, based on his rise from the ninth tier of soccer in England to the Premier League and FIFA World Cup.

In 2013 he married Canadian freestyle skier and Olympic gold medalist, Ashleigh McIvor.

Career statistics

Club

International

Honors
Watford
 Football League Championship play-offs: 2006

United States
 CONCACAF Gold Cup: 2007

See also 
 Junior Messias - another football player who made semi-professional career lately and made progress from semi-professional to world class.

References

External links

Jay DeMerit profile at watfordfc.co.uk

Jay DeMerit feature from 2006 on SI.com

1979 births
Living people
American soccer players
United States men's international soccer players
American expatriate sportspeople in England
Expatriate footballers in England
Expatriate soccer players in Canada
American expatriate soccer players
Sportspeople from Green Bay, Wisconsin
UIC Flames men's soccer players
Chicago Fire U-23 players
Southall F.C. players
Northwood F.C. players
Premier League players
English Football League players
Major League Soccer players
Major League Soccer All-Stars
Watford F.C. players
Vancouver Whitecaps FC players
Soccer players from Wisconsin
American people of Danish descent
CONCACAF Gold Cup-winning players
2007 CONCACAF Gold Cup players
2007 Copa América players
2009 FIFA Confederations Cup players
2010 FIFA World Cup players
Chicago Sockers players
University of Illinois Chicago alumni
USL League Two players
Association football central defenders
American expatriate sportspeople in Canada